Kavitha Dasaratharaj, known professionally as Kavitha, is an Indian actress and politician who predominantly works in Telugu, Tamil and Kannada film industries, she also acted in few Malayalam movies as well. She is well known for her supporting roles in Telugu-language movies like Aada Paandavulu (2013), Chethilo Cheyyesi (2010), Meenakshi (2005), and Yugalageetham (2010). She hails from Andhra Pradesh and her mother tongue is Telugu. Her husband and her son died due to COVID-19 in 2021.

Film career 
Kavitha's family hails from Nidamarru village near Tadepalligudem city of West Godavari district of Andhra Pradesh state. She entered film industry when she was 11 years old by making her debut in Tamil movie O Manju and Telugu movie Siri Siri Muvva, both movies were released in 1976. She acted more than 350 movies in Telugu, Tamil, Malayalam and Kannada languages.

Awards

Filmography 
This list is incomplete; you can help by expanding it.

Telugu 

 Siri Siri Muvva (1976) as Savithri – Debut in Telugu
 Seeta Geeta Daatithe (1977) as Seetha
 Adavi Ramudu (1977)
 Lawyer Viswanath (1978) as Gowri
 Punadhirallu (1979)
 Iddaru Asadhyule (1979)
 Aarani Mantalu (1980) as Latha
 Sarada Ramudu (1980) as Padma
 Nakili Manishi (1980) as Susheela
 Adrushtavanthudu (1980)
 Alludu Pattina Bharatam (1980) ... Radha
 Chuttalunnaru Jagratha (1980)
 Agni Sanskaram (1980)
 Grahanam Vidichindi (1980)
 Sannayi Appanna (1980)
 Oorukichchina Maata (1981) as Sita
 Srivari Muchatlu (1981)
 Premabhishekam (1981) as Kalpana
 Aggi Ravva (1981) as Menaka
 Chinnaari Chittibabu (1981)
 Prathigna (1982)
 Gruha Pravesam (1982)
 Kaliyuga Ramudu (1982) as Savitri
 Doctor Cine Actor (1982) as Latha
 Savaal (1982)
 Bangaru Bhoomi (1982)
 Mooga Vani Paga (1983)
 Prema Pichollu (1983)
 Ee Desamlo Oka Roju (1983)
 Bandipotu Rudramma (1983)
 Palleturi Pidugu (1983)
 Chanda Sasanudu (1983) as Jayasri
 Daku Ravi Himmatwali (1984)
 Amma Rajinama (1991)
 Peddarikam (1992) as Lalitha
 Hello Darling (1992)
 Teerpu (1994) as Kalyani
 Namaste Anna (1994)
 Server Sundaram Gari Abbayi (1995)
 Aayanaki Iddaru (1995)
 Ninne Pelladata (1996)
 Akkada Ammayi Ikkada Abbayi (1996) as Rajeswari
 High Class Atha - Low Class Alludu (1997)
 Prema Pallaki (1998)
 Priyuralu (1998)
 Swayamvaram (1999)
 Sambiah (1999)
 Vichitram (1999)
 Nee Premakai (2002)
 Mounamelanoyi (2002)
 Holi (2002)
 Dham (2003)
 Enjoy (2004)
 Intlo Srimathi Veedhilo Kumari (2004)
 Gudumba Shankar (2004)
 Andaru Dongale Dorikite (2004)
 Apparao Driving School (2004)
 Allari Pidugu (2005)
 Prayatnam (2005)
 Soggadu (2005)
 Pourusham (2005)
 Danger (2005)
 Meenakshi (2005)
 Adirindayya Chandram (2005)
 Premikulu(2005)
 Asadhyudu (2006)
 Seetharamudu (2006)
 Brahmastram (2006)
 Madhumasam (2007)
 Yamagola Malli Modalayindi (2007)
 Viyyalavari Kayyalu (2007)
 Ullasamga Utsahamga (2008)
 Ardham Chesukoru (2008)
 Kuberulu (2008)
 A Aa E Ee (2009)
 Samrajyam (2009)
 Mogudu Kavali (2009)
 Ramdev (2010)
 Yugalageetham (2010)
 Glamour (2010)
 Chalaki (2010)
 Chethilo Cheyyesi (2010)
 Madatha Kaja (2011)
 Galli Kurrollu (2011)
 Maaro (2011)
 Keratam (2011)
 Thrilling (2011)
 Sankranti Alludu (2011)
 Namitha I Love You (2011)
 Sri Vasavi Vaibhavam (2011)
 Tea Samosa Biscuit (2012)
 Damarukam (2012)
 Aada Paandavulu (2013)
 Yesu Kristu Rendava Rakada (2013)
 Sri Manikanta Mahimalu (2015)
 Winner (2017)
 Premika (2017)
 2 Friends (2018)
 Baggidi Gopal (2020)
 Lingadu Ramalingadu (2020)
 Nuvvu Nenu Okkatite (2021)
 Raave Naa Cheliya  (2021)

Tamil 

 O Manju (1976) as Manju – Debut in Tamil (Credited as Kumari Kavitha)
 Rowdy Rakkamma (1977)
 Aalukkoru Aasai (1977)
 Sahodara Sabatham (1977) as Jyothi
 Aattukara Alamelu as Radha
 Kalamadi Kalam (1977) as Kavitha
 Kaatrinile Varum Geetham (1978) as Geetha/Kamini/Rosy
 Andaman Kadhali (1978) as Kavitha
 Ganga Yamuna Kaveri (1978) as Anitha
 Alli Darbar (1978) as Malliga
 General Chakravarthi (1978) as Rani
 Neeya? (1979) as Icchhadhari Snake (2nd form)
 Engal Vathiyar (1980) as Lakshmi
 Ellam Inba Mayyam (1981)
 Aval Oru Kaviyam (1983) as Geetha
 Vaidehi Kalyanam (1991)
 Sevagan (1992)
 Ilavarasan (1992) as Lakshmi
 Natchathira Nayagan (1992) as Kavitha
 Thambi Pondatti (1992) as Lakshmi
 Nadodi Thendral (1992)
 Senthamizh Paattu (1992) as Rajeswari
 Naalaiya Theerpu (1992)
 Mappillai Vanthachu (1992)
 Muthal Seethanam (1992)
 Amaravathi (1993) as Balasubramaniam's wife
 Kattabomman (1993) as Saroja
 Uzhaippali (1993)
 Akkarai Cheemayile (1993)
 Kattalai (1993)
 Aranmanai Kaavalan (1994)
 Kadhalan (1994) as Shruthi's mother
 Sadhu (1994)
 Rajakumaran (1994)
 Sindhu Nathi Poo (1994) as Azhamu
 Seeman (1994)
 Vanaja Girija (1994)
 Thamarai (1994)
 Sathyavan (1994)
 Manasu Rendum Pudhusu (1994)
 Thai Thangai Paasam (1995)
 Mannukku Mariyadhai (1995) as Lakshmi
 Chellakannu (1995) as Kamalamba
 Ilaya Raagam (1995)
 Mr. Romeo (1996)
 Kalloori Vaasal (1996) as Sathya's mother
 Summa Irunga Machan (1996) as Rajamma
 Irattai Roja (1996)
 Alexander (1996)
 Priyam (1996)
 Thuraimugam (1996) as Punniyalakshmi
 Mettukudi (1996)
 Take It Easy Urvashi (1996)
 Avathara Purushan (1996)
 Andha Naal (1996) as Lakshmi
 Raasi (1997) as Karpagam
 Ratchagan (1997)
 Kaadhali (1997)
 Poochudava (1997)
 Kalyana Vaibhogam (1997)
 Aahaa Enna Porutham (1997)
 Naam Iruvar Namakku Iruvar (1998)
 Kumbakonam Gopalu (1998)
 Aval Varuvala (1998) as Roobini
 Poovellam Kettuppar (1999)
 Poomaname Vaa (1999)
 Suyamvaram (1999) as Savithri's mother
 Unakkaga Mattum (2000)
 Pandavar Bhoomi (2001) as Dhanalakshmi
 Gummalam (2002)
 Arasatchi (2004)
 Suyetchai MLA  (2006)
 Aarya (2007) as Aarya's Mother
 Madhavi (2009) as Savitri
 Yuvan (2011)
 Idhayam Thiraiarangam (2012)
 Narathan (2016) as Kamala

Kannada 

 Sahodarara Savaal (1977) as Jyothi
 Rishya Shringa (1977)
 Kiladi Kittu (1978)
 Makkale Devaru (1983)
 Sahasi (1992)
 Kaliyuga Seethe (1992)
 Putnanja (1995)
 Police Power (1995)
 Shiva Leele (1996)
 Ranganna (1997)
 Mahabharatha (1997)
 C.B.I.Durga (1997)
 Akka (1997)
 Mr. Kokila (1999)
 Hrudaya Hrudaya (1999)
 Jeeboomba (2000)
 Super Star (2002)
 Kambala Halli (2002)
 H2O (2002)
 Boothayyana Makkalu (2002)
 Chandra Chakori (2003)
 Miyyav (2003)
 Olave (2005)
 Boyfriend (2005)
 A Aa E Ee (2006)
 Honeymoon Express (2006)
 Hrudaya I Miss You (2008)
 Nee Tata Naa Birla (2008)
 Ullasa Utsaha (2009)

Malayalam 
 Aanayum Ambaariyum (1978)
 Pancharatnam (1979)
 Arthana (1993)
 Agnidevan (1995)
 Sargavasantham (1995)
 Manjeeradhwani (1998)
 Friends (1999)

Television

References

External links 
 

Indian actor-politicians
Tamil actresses
Living people
Telugu actresses
Actresses in Telugu cinema
Actresses in Tamil cinema
Actresses in Tamil television
Actresses in Malayalam cinema
20th-century Indian actresses
21st-century Indian actresses
Actresses in Telugu television
Actresses in Kannada cinema
Year of birth missing (living people)
People from West Godavari district
People from Andhra Pradesh
Telugu people